John Sandford, born John Roswell Camp (born February 23, 1944), is an American New York Times best-selling author, novelist, a former journalist and recipient of the Pulitzer Prize.

Early life
Camp was born in Cedar Rapids, Iowa, the son of Anne Agnes (Barron) and Roswell Sandford Camp. His mother's family was German and Lithuanian. He received a bachelor's degree in American history and literature and a master's in journalism, both from the University of Iowa.

From 1971 to 1978, Camp wrote for The Miami Herald. In 1978, he moved to Minneapolis and started writing for The Saint Paul Pioneer Press as a features reporter; in 1980 he became a daily columnist. That year, he was a Pulitzer finalist for a series of stories on Native American culture. In 1985, during the Midwest farm crisis, he wrote a series entitled "Life on the Land: an American farm family," which followed a typical southwest Minnesota farm family through the course of a full year. For that work, he won the annual Pulitzer Prize for Feature Writing and the American Society of Newspaper Editors award for Non-Deadline Feature Writing. He worked part-time at the Pioneer Press in 1989 and left the next year.

Camp is an avid fiction reader himself. When asked in 2018 "What's your favorite book of all time?" by the New York Times, he responded, "An impossible question. If you put a gun to my head—say a .40-caliber Walther PPQ, or maybe a .45 ACP Colt Gold Cup—I'd say The Once and Future King, by T. H. White." Both weapons he mentioned make appearances in many of his novels.

Camp is a personal friend and hunting companion of fellow Minnesota author Chuck Logan.

Fiction writer
In 1989, Camp wrote two novels that would each spawn a popular series. The Fool's Run (Kidd series) was published under his own name, but the publisher asked him to provide a pseudonym for Rules of Prey ("Prey" series), so it was published under the name John Sandford. After the "Prey" series proved to be more popular, with its charismatic protagonist Lucas Davenport, The Fool's Run and all of its sequels were published under John Sandford.

In 2007, Camp started a third series (also under the name John Sandford), featuring Virgil Flowers, who is a supporting character in some of the "Prey" novels, including Invisible Prey and Storm Prey.

Bibliography

Prey series
Lucas Davenport is the protagonist of the "Prey" series. In the first three novels, he is a maverick detective with the Minneapolis Police Department. At the end of Eyes of Prey, he's forced to resign to avoid excessive force charges, partly due to his knowledge of the connection of a senior police officer to that case. He returns in Night Prey as a deputy chief (a political appointment), running his own intelligence unit. Beginning with Naked Prey, Davenport is an investigator for the Minnesota Department of Public Safety's Bureau of Criminal Apprehension (BCA), acting occasionally as a special troubleshooter for the governor of Minnesota in politically sensitive cases. He serves in that capacity through Gathering Prey, at the end of which he quits working for the BCA, later becoming a United States marshal.

The novel Mind Prey was sold for a TV movie, and Davenport was portrayed by Eriq LaSalle.  Another of the novels, Certain Prey, was adapted into a movie in 2011 by USA Network starring Mark Harmon as Davenport.

Rules of Prey (1989) 
Shadow Prey (1990) 
Eyes of Prey (1991) 
Silent Prey (1992) 
Winter Prey (1993) 
Night Prey (1994) 
Mind Prey (1995) 
Sudden Prey (1996) 
Secret Prey (1998) 
Certain Prey (1999) 
Easy Prey (2000) 
Chosen Prey (2001) 
Mortal Prey (2002) 
Naked Prey (2003) 
Hidden Prey (2004) 
Broken Prey (2005) 
Invisible Prey (2007) 
Phantom Prey (2008) 
Wicked Prey (2009) 
Storm Prey (2010) 
Buried Prey (2011) 
Stolen Prey (2012) 
Silken Prey (2013) 
Field of Prey (2014) 
Gathering Prey (2015) 
Extreme Prey (2016) 
Golden Prey (April 25, 2017) 
Twisted Prey (April 24, 2018) 
Neon Prey (April 23, 2019) 
Masked Prey (April 14, 2020) 
Ocean Prey (April 13, 2021)  
Righteous Prey (October 4, 2022)

Kidd series
The Fool's Run (1989), by John Camp; reissued 1996 as by Sandford 
The Empress File (1991), by John Camp; reissued 1995 as by Sandford 
The Devil's Code (2000) 
The Hanged Man's Song (2003) 
Kidd also has a prominent role in Silken Prey and Extreme Prey.

Virgil Flowers series
The protagonist of the series, Virgil Flowers, is described as tall, lean, late thirties, three times divorced, with long hair and often wears t-shirts featuring rock bands. Virgil works at the Minnesota Bureau of Criminal Apprehension (BCA). Prior to the BCA he was in the Army and the military police, then the police in Saint Paul. Lucas Davenport, main character of the Prey series of books, recruited him into the BCA. Virgil is an avid outdoorsman who loves fishing, and is often towing his boat, even when on duty. He is also a writer for outdoor and hunting magazines, as well as a photographer.

Dark of the Moon (2007)
Heat Lightning (2008)
Rough Country (2009)
Bad Blood (2010)
Shock Wave (2011)
Mad River (2012)
Storm Front (2013)
Deadline (2014)
Escape Clause (2016)
Deep Freeze (October 17, 2017)
Holy Ghost (October 2018)
Bloody Genius (2019)

Virgil Flowers also has a prominent role in Ocean Prey and Righteous Prey.

Singular Menace series (with Michele Cook) 
Uncaged (2014) 
Outrage (2015) 
Rampage (2016)

Letty Davenport series 
Featuring Letty Davenport, daughter of Lucas Davenport of the "Prey" series
The Investigator (2022) ISBN  978-0593328682
Dark Angel (2023) ISBN 978-0593422410

Other fiction books 
The Night Crew (1997) 
Dead Watch (2006) 
Saturn Run (with Ctein) science fiction (2015) ; 0-399-17695-0

Short stories
"Lucy Had a List." Published in Murder in the Rough: Original Tales of Bad Shots, Terrible Lies, and Other Deadly Handicaps from Today's Great Writers (2006), a short story anthology by notable authors, the fourth title in the sports mystery series edited by Otto Penzler.

Nonfiction books
The Eye and the Heart (1988) 
Plastic Surgery (1989) 
Murder in the Rough (2006)

Awards and nominations 
1986, Pulitzer Prize for Feature. Series of articles on Farming Family. Pioneer Press Dispatch

1986 Distinguished Writing Award. American Society of Newspaper Editors.

1980, Pulitzer Prize Nomination. Series of articles on Native Americans. St Paul Pioneer Press Dispatch

References

External links
 
Fantastic Fiction Author Page
 
 
 
 

1944 births
Living people
20th-century American novelists
21st-century American novelists
20th-century American male writers
21st-century American male writers
American mystery writers
American crime fiction writers
American columnists
American male novelists
American people of German descent
American people of Lithuanian descent
Novelists from Minnesota
Pulitzer Prize for Feature Writing winners
University of Iowa alumni
20th-century American non-fiction writers
21st-century American non-fiction writers
American male non-fiction writers